is a 1995 Japanese film directed by Takumi Kimizuka based on the 1992 novel by Ayako Saito.

Cast
Kaho Minami as Matsunaga Maiko
Tsugumi Arimura as Sirani(Yaoyo Takahashi)
Jun Togawa as Yoshimi
Reiko Takashima as Kyoko
Haruko Mabuchi as Sayuri
Jinpachi Nezu as Hisao Kagami

References

External links 

1990s Japanese-language films
Japanese LGBT-related films
Lesbian-related films
1995 films
Toei Company films
1990s Japanese films